K-179 is an  state highway in Harper County, Kansas. It runs from Oklahoma State Highway 132 (SH-132) the Oklahoma state line north to the city of Anthony, where it ends at K-44. The route was designated around 1956, and is not part of the National Highway System.

Route description 
Just north of Manchester, Oklahoma, K-179 begins running west along the Oklahoma state line as a continuation of SH-132. The route then turns due north and continues through flat farm fields. A series of curves take the highway slightly to the northeast before it enters the city of Anthony, where it becomes known as Jennings Avenue.

All but  of K-179's alignment is maintained by the Kansas Department of Transportation (KDOT). The entire section of K-179 within Anthony is maintained by the city. Every year, KDOT measures traffic on each of its state highways in terms of average annual daily traffic (AADT). In 2012, K-179 was found to have AADT counts of 303 on the first  of the route and 433 just south of Anthony, the route's lowest and highest counts, respectively. The highway is not a part of the United States National Highway System.

History
The road that would become K-179 first appeared on the 1936 state highway map as a paved county road connection. This roadway was designated as K-179 around 1956. The routing of the highway has not been modified since its designation.

Major intersections

References

External links

KDOT State Map
Kansas Highways Routelog - K-179

179